The 2004 Proximus Diamond Games was a women's professional tennis tournament played on indoor carpet courts at the Sportpaleis in Antwerp, Belgium that was part of the Tier II category of the 2004 WTA Tour. It was the third edition of the tournament and was held from 16 February until 22 February 2002. First-seeded Kim Clijsters won the singles title and earned $93,000 first-prize money.

Finals

Singles

 Kim Clijsters defeated  Silvia Farina Elia, 6–3, 6–0

Doubles

 Cara Black /  Els Callens defeated  Myriam Casanova /  Eleni Daniilidou, 6–2, 6–1

External links
 ITF tournament edition details
 Tournament draws

Proximus Diamond Games
Diamond Games
2004 in Belgian tennis